Cepora abnormis, the Papuan gull, is a species of butterfly in the family Pieridae found in Indonesia.

The larvae feed on Capparis zippeliana.

Subspecies
The following subspecies are recognised:
 Cepora abnormis abnormis (West Irian to New Guinea)
 Cepora abnormis euryxantha (Honrath, 1892) (New Guinea to Papua New Guinea)

References

Pierini
Butterflies described in 1867
Butterflies of Indonesia
Taxa named by Alfred Russel Wallace